Beinn an Dòthaidh (from the Gaelic for 'hill of the scorching or singeing'), is a mountain in the Bridge of Orchy hills of Argyll and Bute, Scotland. It is located beside the more popular Beinn Dòrain. The two hills are frequently climbed together from the bealach between them, which is easily accessed from the Bridge of Orchy railway station.

Alternatively, Beinn an Dòthaidh may be climbed via its northwest ridge, or combined with an ascent of Beinn Achaladair to the northeast.

In a good winter, Coire Daingean on Beinn an Dòthaidh becomes a winter climbing venue, offering routes from Scottish grade III through grade V. A topo detailing the routes may be downloaded here. and the UK Climbing page here.

References

Munros
Mountains and hills of the Southern Highlands
Marilyns of Scotland
Mountains and hills of Argyll and Bute
One-thousanders of Scotland